Benjamin Philip Kleibrink (born 30 July 1985, in Düsseldorf) is a German left-handed foil fencer, 2007 team European champion, two-time Olympian, two-time Olympic medalist, and 2008 Olympic champion.

Medal Record

Olympic Games

World Championship

European Championship

Grand Prix

World Cup

References

External links
  
 
 
 

1985 births
German male fencers
Fencers at the 2008 Summer Olympics
Fencers at the 2012 Summer Olympics
Olympic fencers of Germany
Olympic gold medalists for Germany
Sportspeople from Düsseldorf
Living people
Olympic bronze medalists for Germany
Olympic medalists in fencing
Medalists at the 2012 Summer Olympics
Medalists at the 2008 Summer Olympics
Fencers at the 2020 Summer Olympics